Rolueckia is a genus of leaf-dwelling lichens in the family Gomphillaceae. It was circumscribed in 2008 by Thai lichenologists Khwanruan Papong, Achra Thammathaworn, and Kansri Boonpragob. The three species in the genus were formerly part of the Calenia conspersa group, previously part of the genus Calenia. The type species, Rolueckia conspersa, was first described as Thelotrema conspersum by James Stirton in 1879.

Species
Rolueckia aggregata  (2008)
Rolueckia conspersa  (2008)
Rolueckia siamensis  (2008)

References

Ostropales
Lichen genera
Taxa described in 2008
Ostropales genera